Patrik Ježek (born 28 December 1976) is a former Czech football midfielder who last played for Admira Wacker in the Austrian Bundesliga. He scored the fastest goal in Austrian league history, scoring after 10 seconds in a 4–1 win against Altach in the opening round of the 2007–08 season.

Honours
 4× Austrian Champion (2000 with FK Austria Wien, 2002 with FC Tirol Innsbruck, 2007 and 2009 with FC Red Bull Salzburg)
 1× Czech Champion (2003 with Sparta Prague)
 fastest goal (10 seconds) in the history of Austrian football

References

External links
 
 
 

1976 births
Living people
Czech footballers
Czech Republic youth international footballers
Czech Republic under-21 international footballers
Association football midfielders
Czech First League players
FC Viktoria Plzeň players
AC Sparta Prague players
Austrian Football Bundesliga players
FC Red Bull Salzburg players
FK Austria Wien players
Karlsruher SC players
2. Bundesliga players
Czech expatriate footballers
Expatriate footballers in Austria
Expatriate footballers in Germany
Sportspeople from Plzeň
Czech expatriate sportspeople in Austria
Czech expatriate sportspeople in Germany
FC Tirol Innsbruck players